Lumbang (Lumbana) is a village in Falam Township, Falam District Chin State, Myanmar,  north of the town of Falam on the Tedim Road. Lumbang observes Myanmar Time with a UTC offset of 6.5 hours.

Notes

External links
 "Lumbang Map — Satellite Images of Lumbang" Maplandia World Gazetteer

Populated places in Chin State